Lekha Dodi is a Hebrew-language Jewish liturgical song recited Friday at dusk, usually at sundown, in synagogue to welcome the Sabbath prior to the evening services. It is part of Kabbalat Shabbat.

The refrain of Lekha Dodi means "Let us go, my beloved, to greet the bride/the Sabbath presence, let us welcome" and is a request of Israel's "beloved" (God) to join together in welcoming a "bride" (the sabbath). The phrase "Let us go, my beloved" is taken from Song of Songs 7:12 (7:11 in English bibles), which Abba b. Joseph b. Ḥama interpreted as Israel talking to God. During the singing of the last verse, the entire congregation rises and turns to the west (traditional congregations face Jerusalem for the rest of services) or to the door; some have the custom to exit the sanctuary of the synagogue. The congregation bows at "Come, O bride!" and turns back toward the front of the synagogue; some bow only forwards and others to the sides and then forwards.

It was composed in the 16th century by Shlomo Halevi Alkabetz, who was born in Thessaloniki and later became a Safed Kabbalist. As was common at the time, the song is also an acrostic, with the first letter of the first eight stanzas spelling the author's name. The author draws from the rabbinic interpretation of Song of Songs in which the maiden is seen as a metaphor for the Jews and the lover (dod) is a metaphor for God, and from Nevi'im, which uses the same metaphor. The poem shows Israel asking God to bring upon that great Shabbat of Messianic deliverance. It is one of the latest of the Hebrew poems regularly accepted into the traditional liturgy.

Melody 

Among some Sephardic congregations, the hymn is sometimes chanted to an ancient Moorish melody, which is known to be much older than the text of Lekha Dodi. This is clear not only from internal evidence, but also from the rubric in old siddurim directing the hymn "to be sung to the melody of Shuvi Nafshi li-Menukhayekhi, a composition of Judah Halevi, who died nearly five centuries before Alkabetz. In this rendering, carried to Israel by Spanish refugees before the days of Alkabetz, the hymn is chanted congregationally, the refrain being employed as an introduction only.

In some very old-style Ashkenazic synagogues the verses are ordinarily chanted at elaborate length by the hazzan, and the refrain is used as a congregational response, but in most Ashkenazic Orthodox synagogues it is sung by everyone together to any of a large number of tunes. This includes the Orthodox Synagogues who employ this element and Synagogues under the Modern-Orthodox umbrella.

Old German and Polish melodies
At certain periods of the year many northern congregations discard later compositions in favor of two simple older melodies singularly reminiscent of the folk-song of northern Europe in the century succeeding that in which the verses were written. The better known of these is an air, reserved for the Omer weeks between Passover and Shavuot, which has been variously described, because of certain of its phrases, as an adaptation of the famous political song "Lillibullero" and of the cavatina in the beginning of Mozart's "Nozze di Figaro." But resemblances to German folk-song of the end of the seventeenth century may be found generally throughout the melody.

Less widely utilized in the present day is the special air traditional for the "Three Weeks" preceding Tisha b'Av, although this is characterized by much tender charm absent from the melody of Eli Tziyyon, which more often takes its place. But it was once very generally sung in the northern congregations of Europe; and a variant was chosen by Benedetto Marcello for his rendition of Psalm xix. in his "Estro Poetico-Armonico" or "Parafrasi Sopra li Salmi" (Venice, 1724), where it is quoted as an air of the German Jews. Cantor Eduard Birnbaum ("Der Jüdische Kantor", 1883, p. 349) has discovered the source of this melody in a Polish folk-song, "Wezm ja Kontusz, Wezm", given in Oskar Kolberg's "Piesni Ludu Polskiego" (Warsaw, 1857). An old melody, of similarly obvious folk-song origin, was favored in the London Jewry a century ago, and was sung in two slightly divergent forms in the old city synagogues. Both of these forms are given by Isaac Nathan in his setting of Byron's "Hebrew Melodies" (London, 1815), where they constitute the air selected for "She Walks in Beauty", the first verses in the series. The melody has since fallen out of use in English congregations and elsewhere.

Text
The full version of the song (note that many Reform congregations omit verses 3, 4, 6, 7 and 8 which make reference to messianic redemption), while Sephardic congregations based in the Jerusalem and Aleppo rites omit verse 4 and verses 6 through 8, as they make reference to agony:

In the Sephardic rite and Chasidic tradition the last section is recited as such:

Notes 

Verse 1, line 3:   'Safeguard' and 'Remember' in one  utterance:  The Ten Commandments appears twice in the Torah, in Exodus 20:8 it reads "Remember (zakhor) the Sabbath Day" and in Deuteronomy 5:12 it reads "Safeguard (shamor) the Sabbath Day"; the folkloric explanation for the difference is that, supernaturally, both words were spoken by God simultaneously.  Here the second expression is used first in the verse to accommodate the acrostic of the composer's name.

Verse 2, line 10:  Last made,  but first planned:  The Sabbath Day, the seventh and last day of Creation, was, essentially, the last thing created in that week and yet it is believed that a day of cessation, reflection, and worship was part of God's plan from the very first.

Verse 8, line 33: By the hand of a child of Peretz:   Meaning a descendant of Peretz, a son of Judah, an ancestor of King David; a poetical description of the Messiah.

See also

 List of Jewish prayers and blessings

References

Notes

Bibliography 
 English translation and discussion: in Kabbalat Shabbat: Welcoming Shabbat in the Synagogue, Rabbi Lawrence A. Hoffman, ed.  Jewish Lights Publishing.  2004.  .
Hebrew book with English introduction: Reuven Kimelman, The Mystical Meaning of ‘Lekha Dodi’ and ‘Kabbalat Shabbat’, The Hebrew University Magnes Press, and Cherub Press, 2003
 Traditional settings: A. Baer, Ba'al Tefillah, Nos. 326-329, 340-343, Gothenburg, 1877, Frankfort, 1883;
 Francis Cohen and David M. Davis, Voice of Prayer and Praise, Nos. 18, 19a, and 19b, London, 1899;
 F. Consolo, Libro dei Canti d'Israele, part. i, Florence, 1892;
 De Sola and Aguilar, Ancient Melodies, p. 16 and No. 7, London, 1857;
 Israel, London, i. 82; iii. 22, 204;
 Journal of the Folk-Song Society, i., No. 2, pp. 33, 37, London, 1900. Translations, etc.: Israel, iii. 22;
 H. Heine, Werke, iii. 234, Hamburg, 1884;
 J. G. von Herder, Werke, Stuttgart, 1854;
 A. Lucas, The Jewish Year, p. 167, London, 1898

External links
  Lecha Dodi Hassidic version free style by Cantor Fahlenkamp  all verses with   lyrics YouTube video
  Lecha Dodi with Sephardic last verse  YouTube video
  לכה דודי/Lecha Dodi- אסף נוה שלום verses 1-5 only.  YouTube video 
  Audio file "Lekha Dodi" MP3
  Audio file "Lekha Dodi" MP3
  Lekha Dodi with music from The Jewish Learning Group from the Chabad-Lubavitch Media Center
  Lekha Dodi tunes and recordings on the Zemirot Database

  "Lekah Dodi"

Hebrew-language literature
Jewish practices
Jewish belief and doctrine
Jewish liturgical poems
Jewish mysticism
Jewish prayer and ritual texts
Kabbalah texts
Hebrew words and phrases in Jewish prayers and blessings